Santo André and Sancha Lagoons Natural Reserve is a natural reserve in Portugal. It is one of the 30 areas which are officially under protection in the country.

References

Nature reserves in Portugal
Ramsar sites in Portugal
Alentejo